Krister Linder is a Swedish electronic musician.

Krister started his music career in 1987 as the vocalist of the Swedish band Grace. Under the name Chris Lancelot, he was the vocalist of the Swedish band Dive from 1990 to 1994.

Linder went on to compose and produce experimental electronic music until he released his first solo album as a vocalist, Songs from the Silent Years in 2006. He is also the lead vocalist in the Swedish heavy metal band Enter the Hunt. Other musical efforts include scoring for TV commercials, short movies and feature films.  His score in the documentary film Gitmo: The New Rules of War (directed by Erik Gandini and Tarik Saleh) won the first prize in  the category Music For TV at the Festival international Musique et Cinéma in Auxerre, France in 2006. In November 2008 he won first prize in the category Best Music at the Stockholm International Film Festival for his score to the feature film Downloading Nancy (directed by Johan Renck). In 2009, he won the Jameson Film Music Award at the Stockholm International Film Festival for the score to the animated feature film Metropia (directed by Tarik Saleh) and that same year, he did co-vocals on the song "Departer" on the album Night Is the New Day by Katatonia. He also did vocals for Omnimotion's remix of the song Tierra Azul, originally by Vibrasphere. His recent credits include the score for the 2013 documentary feature, While No One Is Watching. He composed an exclusive track used for the 2016 Chanel N°5 perfume television advertisement.

Solo albums
Alaskanlab Sweden 1995, 1995 (as Tupilaq)
Holtkötter, 1996 (as Yeti)
First Wave, 2000 (as Solaroid)
Songs from the Silent Years, 2006
Metropia, 2009
The Nile Hilton Incident, 2017
Across the never, 2019

References

External links
Official website
Official Myspace page
Official blog
Official Enter the Hunt website

Swedish electronic musicians
Swedish heavy metal singers
Swedish songwriters
Living people
1970 births
Swedish film score composers
Male film score composers
21st-century Swedish singers
21st-century Swedish male singers